Caraguatay, Guaraní: Karaguatay) is a distrito and town located in the Vapor Cué region of the Cordillera Department in Paraguay.  The livelihood of most citizens includes farming, fishing, and local trading.

Climate
The climate in this department is mild and dry. The average temperature is 22 °C, in summer reaches 39 °C and in winter drops to 3 °C.

Demography

Caraguatay had a population of 11,568, including 6,045 men and 5,523 women, at the 2002 census.

Many of its inhabitants traveled to the United States to work, and send remittances to their families.  Building work in the city shows the great investment that this income provided.

History

A Spanish family Franco founded the city on 24 September 1770, during the governorate of Carlos Morphi, on the banks of Yhaguy River. This locality was previously called Puesto Mbocajaty and included the areas of Iriarte, Ybyraity and Yeguarizo.

It is one of the oldest localities of the country. It possesses a beautiful colonial architecture, with well-cared-for gardens and streets.

Economy

Employment is focused on agriculture and cattle. Many of its people have gone to work in other countries, specially the United States, and the receiving of remittances is the greatest city income.

Tourism

The foundation of the city on 24 September, coincides with the patron saint's festivities of the Virgen De Las Mercedes, in which are organized official, liturgical and student events, in addition to musical and dancing festivals.  Celebrations are also held on 14 May, the day of Saint Francis Labrador

Marshall López and Eliza Lynch used to live in a house in Caraguatay, the house of the Miranda family, before they moved to San Estanislao.

The Ykuá Ramírez was a camp of the Paraguayan troops during the War of 1870.

Close to the city centre and beside the Yhaguy River is the "Vapor Cué National Park", an open-air museum, where the remains of six ships of the Paraguayan forces that participated in the War of 1870 are exhibited. The ships, Anhambay, Paraná, Pirabebé/Piravevé, Rio Apa, Salto del Guairá and Yporá, were set on fire and sunk towards the end of that war, to deny them to the enemy.  Beginning in 1978, their remains were recovered and are now displayed, partly restored, alongside other objects, flags and photographs from their time.

How to get there

Caraguatay is 91 kilometers from Asunción, taking the Route number 2. In the center of Eusebio Ayala, 65 kilometers from Asunción, there is a deviation to the north, which leads to Caraguatay and other cities.

In Asunción, from the central bus station, there are several buses that go to Caraguatay.

People from Caraguatay

Three Paraguayan presidents were born in Caraguatay:
 Juan Antonio Escurra (1859–1919)
 Emiliano González Navero (1861–1940)
 José Félix Estigarribia (1888–1940)

Others personalities:
 Commandant Lara, Hero of the War of 1870
 Quemil Yambay, comedian and musician
 Gregorio y Cirilo Ortega
 Monsignor Demetrio Aquino
Christian Gayoso

Gallery

References 

 Geografía Ilustrada del Paraguay, Distribuidora Arami SRL; 2007. 
 Geografía del Paraguay, Primera Edición 1999, Editorial Hispana Paraguay SRL

External links 
Secretaria Nacional de Turismo
World Gazeteer: Paraguay – World-Gazetteer.com	
Google map of Caraguatay

Populated places in the Cordillera Department